Crocodile Dundee in Los Angeles (also known as Crocodile Dundee III) is a 2001 action comedy film directed by Simon Wincer and starring Paul Hogan. It is the sequel to Crocodile Dundee II (1988) and the third and final film of the Crocodile Dundee film series. Hogan and Linda Kozlowski reprise their roles as Michael "Crocodile" Dundee and Sue Charlton, respectively. The film was shot on location in Los Angeles and in Queensland. Actor Paul Hogan reported that the inspiration for the storyline came during a tour of Litomyšl, Czech Republic in 1993. It was released on April 18, 2001 in the United States. It grossed $39.4 million worldwide and received negative reviews from critics who called it an unnecessary sequel.

Plot
Michael "Crocodile" Dundee is living in the Australian outback with Sue Charlton and their young son Mikey. Crocodile hunting has been made illegal, and Mick is reduced to wrestling crocodiles for the entertainment of tourists. He has a rival in the business, another outback survivalist named Jacko. When an opportunity arises for Sue to become the Los Angeles bureau chief of a newspaper owned by her father, Mick and his family cross the Pacific to California.

In the United States, both Mick and his son have encounters with the locals, causing cross-cultural mishaps. Mick becomes an undercover amateur sleuth, helping to probe the mysterious death of his wife's predecessor at the newspaper, while Mikey attends a local school, where he quickly impresses his classmates and teacher with his outback survival skills. Because the case takes up so much of their time, Mick and Sue eventually call in Jacko to babysit their son; immediately, Jacko and Mikey's teacher become interested in each other.

It is revealed that the dead reporter had been investigating a film studio, which is about to make a sequel to the action film Lethal Agent, despite the title's commercial failure. Mick becomes suspicious when several paintings from Southern Europe are brought onto the set; although at first he suspects drug smuggling, the pictures themselves are revealed to be missing art from a museum in former Yugoslavia, thought lost in the recent civil wars. They are to appear in the film as mere props, to be publicly 'destroyed' in a scene in which they are set on fire, at which point they will have been exchanged for copies.

Attempting to secure one of the paintings as evidence, Mick, Sue, and Jacko run afoul of the studio director and his thugs. Using the studio's props and three lions used in filming to defeat the gangsters, Mick and Sue solve the case and return to Australia, where they are officially married.

Cast

 Paul Hogan as Michael J. "Crocodile" Dundee
 Linda Kozlowski as Sue Charlton
 Jere Burns as Arnan Rothman
 Jonathan Banks as Miloš Drubnik
 Alec Wilson as Jacko
 Gerry Skilton as Nugget O'Cass
 Steve Rackman as Donk
 Serge Cockburn as Michael "Mikey" Dundee II / Michael Charlton
 Aida Turturro as Jean Ferraro
 Paul Rodriguez as Diego
 Kaitlin Hopkins as Miss Mathis
 Mike Tyson as Himself

Reception

Box office
The film grossed $7,759,103 at the box office in Australia. The film debuted in 4th place at the US box office behind Bridget Jones's Diary (which was #1 in its second weekend), Spy Kids and Along Came a Spider. It grossed $39 million worldwide, below the total gross of the previous two films. In a 2017 interview, comedian and actor Tom Green stated that the box office receipts for his film Freddy Got Fingered did not reflect the actual attendance, as he thinks that movie goers under the age of seventeen bought tickets to Crocodile Dundee in Los Angeles and snuck into the theater showing his film.

Critical response
On Rotten Tomatoes the film has a score of 11% based on reviews from 80 critics. The site's consensus reads: "A sequel as unnecessary as it is belated, Crocodile Dundee in Los Angeles lacks virtually all of the easygoing humor and charm that delighted fans of the original". On Metacritic the film has a score of 37% based on reviews from 33 critics, indicating generally unfavorable reviews. Audiences polled by CinemaScore gave the film an average grade of "B−" on an A+ to F scale.

Roger Ebert of the Chicago Sun-Times gave the film 2 out of 4 and wrote: "It may not be brilliant, but who would you rather your kids took as a role model: Crocodile Dundee, David Spade or Tom Green?", referring to the stars of contemporary theatrical releases Joe Dirt and Freddy Got Fingered, respectively. Variety called it "amiable rather than genuinely funny".

Accolades
The film was nominated for a Razzie Award for Worst Remake or Sequel but lost to Planet of the Apes.

References

External links

 
 
 
 
 
 Crocodile Dundee in Los Angeles at Oz Movie

2000s English-language films
Crocodile Dundee
2001 films
American sequel films
2001 action comedy films
Australian action comedy films
American action comedy films
Films scored by Basil Poledouris
Films directed by Simon Wincer
Films set in Australia
Films set in Los Angeles
Films shot in Los Angeles
Paramount Pictures films
Universal Pictures films
Australian sequel films
2001 comedy films
Films shot at Village Roadshow Studios
2000s American films